Kastri may refer to several places in Greece:

Kastri, Arcadia, a village in the municipality North Kynouria, Arcadia
Kastri, Attica, a city quarter in Nea Erythraia in Athens
Kastri, Crete, a village in the Chania regional unit
Kastri, Evrymenes, a village in the Ioannina regional unit
Kastri, Gavdos is the capital of the island of Gavdos in the Chania regional unit
Kastri, Cythera, an ancient settlement on the island of Cythera
Kastri, Larissa, a village in the municipal unit Lakereia, Larissa regional unit
Kastri, Phocis, a medieval village on the site of Delphi
Kastri, Preveza, a village in the municipal unit Fanari, Preveza regional unit
, a prehistoric settlement on the island of Syros, Syros-Ermoupoli regional unit; see Syros#Kastri culture
Kastri, Thesprotia, a village in Thesprotia